Chaitali Chakrabarti from the Arizona State University, Tempe, AZ was named Fellow of the Institute of Electrical and Electronics Engineers (IEEE) in 2012 "for contributions to low power embedded system design and to very large scale integration architectures for signal processing".

References

Fellow Members of the IEEE
Living people
Year of birth missing (living people)
Place of birth missing (living people)
Arizona State University faculty